Joseph Bruno Stadium is a stadium located on the campus of Hudson Valley Community College in Troy, New York. It is the home field of the Tri-City ValleyCats minor league baseball team of the independent Frontier League and previously the New York–Penn League. Located in the center of the tri-city area of New York's Capital Region (Albany, Schenectady and Troy), it was named after former New York State Senate Majority Leader Joseph Bruno, who helped secure the funds for the ballpark.

Attendance
In 2012, the ValleyCats set a new single-season attendance record for the 9th-consecutive year, drawing 159,966 fans. The record was bolstered by 17 sellout crowds, also a new franchise record.

The ValleyCats set attendance records in 2004 (110,497), 2005 (116,674), 2006 (129,126), 2007 (136,809), 2008 (140,631), 2009 (145,976), 2010 (155,315), 2011 (156,279) and yet again in 2012 (159,966). The 'Cats have drawn a grand total of 1,463,669 fans since their inception in 2002. They welcomed in their 1.5 millionth fan during the 2013 season.

Other events

2008 New York–Penn League All-Star Game
On August 19 "The Joe" hosted the 2008 New York–Penn League All-Star game, the fourth in league history. The game was won by the NL All-Stars with a walk off RBI by ValleyCats third baseman David Flores. This game was the second largest opening for "The Joe" in the 2008 season.

K.O. at the Joe
K.O. at the Joe was a series of amateur boxing matches held at the stadium. The first was in 2007 and was brought back in 2008 and 2009.

World Series Trophy viewing
On May 5, 2011, the San Francisco Giants World Series Trophy was on display for Capital Region fans. The stop in Troy was part of a public tour the team launched to celebrate its first World Series championship since 1954, and the first since moving from New York City to San Francisco. The franchise originally began in Troy, competing as the Troy Trojans from 1879–1882.

On August 3, 2018, the Houston Astros World Series trophy was on display at the Joe after Houston won its first championship.

Metro Atlantic Athletic Conference tournament
From May 24–27, 2012, the stadium hosted the 2012 Metro Atlantic Athletic Conference baseball tournament, which was won by Manhattan.

References

External links

Tri-City Valley Cats
Hudson Valley Community College
Charlie’s Big Baseball Parks Page - Joseph Bruno Stadium
Joseph Bruno Stadium Views - Ball Parks of the Minor Leagues

Sports venues in Rensselaer County, New York
Minor league baseball venues
Baseball venues in New York (state)
Buildings and structures in Troy, New York
2002 establishments in New York (state)
Sports venues completed in 2002
College baseball venues in the United States